The Yakima Valley SunDome is a 6,195-seat multi-purpose arena in Yakima, Washington, United States. It was built in 1990, on the Central Washington State Fairgrounds, by contractor Gilbert H. Moen Co and architecture firm Loofburrow & Associates. The SunDome was designed to host sporting events, i.e. basketball, soccer, volleyball, ice shows, horse shows, circuses, boxing and concerts, as well as agricultural expos, trade shows, symposiums, conventions, and much more.

The Yakima Valley SunDome constituted the second Dome in the world to use a concrete sectional roof design (24 segments), the first being Seattle's Kingdome.

The SunDome hosts many annual events, including the WIAA 1A and 2A High School Basketball State Tournaments, WIAA B, BB, A, AA, AAA, & AAAA High School Volleyball State Tournaments, and the WIAA Dance and Drill 2B, 1A, 2A & 3A State Championships.

The SunDome was the home of the Yakima SunKings basketball team from 1990 to 2008, and in 2018 and 2019. The SunDome has occasionally hosted indoor American football, including the Yakima Shockwave of the National Indoor Football League in 2001 and the Yakima Valley Warriors of the American Indoor Football Association who played home games at the SunDome in 2010 and will soon host the Yakima Canines of the American West Football Conference starting in 2021.

References

Indoor arenas in Washington (state)
Buildings and structures in Yakima, Washington
Sports venues in Washington (state)
Basketball venues in Washington (state)
Sports venues completed in 1990
Tourist attractions in Yakima County, Washington
1990 establishments in Washington (state)
Continental Basketball Association venues
The Basketball League venues